Rubika  is a proprietary, cross-platform Iranian messaging app. It is sponsored by the Government of Iran and the public-private mobile telecommunications companies Tusca holding,  Mobile Telecommunication Company of Iran, and MTN Irancell. Rubika features include a free digital assistant, video calls, business pages and shopping channels, creator ads monetization, photo sharing, live broadcast, TV and video streaming, payment wallet, dark mode, Balad maps and required-to-purchase Bime free health insurance. The platform has 15.5 million daily and 35-40 million monthly users. It has financial backed equal to all Iranian startups.

Security
Rubika was banned and lost its media license for streaming movies in 2020. It was removed by Google Play Protect in 2022. It is surveilled in part through Hamrahe aval Digital platform monitoring center.

Software forks
Shaad

References

Instant messaging
Internet in Iran